Estadio Daniel Alcides Carrión is a multi-use stadium located in Cerro de Pasco, Peru. It is used by football team Unión Minas.  The stadium holds 8,000 people and is the highest stadium in the world, with an altitude of 4,380 meters (13,973 ft) above sea level. This makes it very difficult for players who are not used to playing at this height and has caused some controversy.

References

Daniel Alcides Carrion
Buildings and structures in Pasco Region